Oswaldo Alfredo de Lima Gonçalves (born 27 December 1992), is a Brazilian footballer who plays as a defender.

Career statistics

Honours

Club
Sport
 Copa do Nordeste: 2014
 Campeonato Pernambucano: 2014

References

External links

1992 births
Living people
Brazilian footballers
Sport Club do Recife players
Association football defenders
Sportspeople from Pernambuco